= Geology of Saint Vincent and the Grenadines =

The geology of Saint Vincent and the Grenadines formed due to overlapping basalt volcanic massifs within the last five million years since the Pliocene, although there may be deeper and older rocks that are poorly understood. Rocks grow younger further north.
